Riccardia multifida is a species of liverwort belonging to the family Aneuraceae.

It has cosmopolitan distribution.

References

Metzgeriales